In Judaism, a ba'al teshuvah (for a woman,  or ; plural, 'owner of return [to God or his way]') is a Jew who adopts some form of traditional religious observance after having previously followed a secular lifestyle or a less stringent form of Judaism.

Originally, the term referred to a Jew who transgressed the halakhah (Jewish law) knowingly or unknowingly and completed a process of introspection to "return" to the full observance of God's mitzvot. According to the Mishneh Torah of Maimonides, the Talmud says that a true ba'al teshuvah stands higher in shamayim (lit. 'heaven') than a "frum from birth", even higher than a tzadik:

In modern times, the phrase is primarily used to refer to a Jew from a non-Orthodox background who becomes religiously observant in an Orthodox fashion. However, there is no strict definition of a ba'al teshuva and so the concept can also encompass Orthodox-leaning Jews who become stricter in their observance, such as those who go from keeping kosher only at home to also avoiding non-kosher restaurants.
In Hebrew,  translates to 'returning to return' or 'returning to repentance'.

According to the teachings of the Torah, "whoever judges himself will not be judged"; however, in the described history of Talmudic times and early Hasidism, many tzadikim were able to "see" the transgressions of others.

For the most part, the stature and the preparation of these Tzadikim presuppose a balance that allows a peaceful coexistence even with those who have committed serious transgressions because otherwise, the intent to rage against them and, worse, to obtain advantages from them would certainly prevail.

See also
 Baal teshuva movement
 Orthodox Judaism outreach

References

 

Hebrew words and phrases